Love is... is a Philippine television film by Eat Bulaga! and was aired on October 21, 2017, at GMA Network without any commercial break.  It was directed by Adolf Alix Jr. starring the AlDub love team of Alden Richards and Maine Mendoza.  The main plot of the television film drama revolves around the effects of clinical depression to a person.  Eat Bulaga! also released the whole television film on its official YouTube channel under Creative Commons Attribution License and distributed by GMA Pictures.

On the day that it was broadcast on television, the official hashtag of the show (#ALDUBxEBLoveIs) trended on Twitter where it landed on the top spot in the Philippines and the second spot worldwide.  It generated around 1.38 million tweets even before the television film started.  According to the AGB Nielsen, Love is... got a television rating of 7.8%, which is the highest percentage on its time slot.

Plot 
Vivienne (Maine Mendoza) and Marco (Alden Richards) prepares for their wedding after Marco proposes marriage to Vivienne at Antipolo.  Marco's family is expected to shoulder all the expenses for the wedding but Vivienne wants to chip in.  So, she works hard as an associate creative director and social media influencer to be able to save money for their marriage funds.

One day, Vivienne bumps into her cousin Edwin (Marky Lopez) who offers her business opportunities to which Vivienne responds positively.  After coming home, Vivienne talks to her father (Nonie Buencamino) about Edwin's offer and her desire to invest on stocks through Edwin because she intends to increase her contribution to her wedding funds.  Her father gave Vivienne his retirement fund that he received for being an Overseas Filipino Worker as money to be used for the stock investment.

Unfortunately, Vivienne's father suffers from a stroke and she has to use her marriage funds for her father's hospitalization and medical expenses with Marco's permission.  It also turns out that Edwin's business dealings are sham.  These series of events trigger Vivienne to a period of sadness that affected her work.  She is forced by the management to take a leave from work due to persistent negligence.  With that, she begins to abandon her relationship with Marco, her friends and her family.  She only remains in her bedroom for days without even eating.

Marco keeps on contacting Vivienne but she avoids him often.  Vivienne replies only after Marco invites her for a family dinner.  At the dinner, Marco already suspects that Vivienne is having clinical depression due to her actions and physical appearance.  Marco tells this to his mother (Bing Pimentel) when Vivienne steps out.  His mother says that Vivienne could be crazy.  Vivienne overhears the conversation and she walks away then Marco runs after her and tries to comfort her.  Still, Vivienne pushes him away and returns the engagement ring then leaves him.

Vivienne goes to Antipolo to where Marco proposed.  She brings sleeping pills with her as she attempts suicide.  Marco still tries to contact her but she is not responding.  He checks her social media posts and he has clue where she is.  Just in time, Marco averts Vivienne's bid to sleeping pills overdose.  He consoles her and promises that he will never forsake her and he loves her for everything she is.

They go to a psychiatrist to find a cure for Vivienne's depression.  After Vivienne's treatment, she posts a video online saying that love is accepting who she is.  Marco proposes again to Vivienne and she says yes then they kiss.

Cast

Main cast 
 Alden Richards as Marco
 Maine Mendoza as Vivienne Castro

Supporting cast 
 Nonie Buencamino as Roman
 Sharmaine Buencamino as Aurora
 Dianne Medina as Lara
 Rodjun Cruz as John
 Marco Alcaraz as Miguel
 Precious Lara Quigaman as Angela
 Bing Pimentel as Marco's mother
 Marky Lopez as Edwin
 Shiela Marie Rodriguez as Ms. Mel
 Prince Stefan as Vivienne's friend

References

External links
 Love is... at Eat Bulaga!'s YouTube channel

Filipino-language films
Films about depression
Films about families
Philippine New Wave
Philippine television films
2017 television films
2017 films
Drama television films
Romance television films